Robert Ecklund (born May 23, 1958) is a Minnesota politician and a former member of the Minnesota House of Representatives. A member of the Minnesota Democratic–Farmer–Labor Party (DFL), he formerly represented District 3A in northeastern Minnesota.

Early life and career
Ecklund was born on May 23, 1958. He is a former United States Marine Corps serviceman, serving from 1976 to 1979. He attended Rainy River Community College and Bemidji State University from 1980 to 1983.

He has worked at the Boise Paper mill in International Falls, Minnesota as a paper machine tender since 1989, previously served as president of the United Steelworkers Local 159 for nine years, and served on the Koochiching County Board of Commissioners, first elected in 2010 and re-elected in 2014.

Minnesota House of Representatives
Ecklund was elected to the Minnesota House of Representatives in a special election on December 8, 2015. He was elected following the death of prior representative David Dill, also a member of the DFL party. He represents district 3A, serving Cook, Koochiching, Lake, and St. Louis counties. During the 2017-2018 session, Ecklund served as an assistant minority leader for the DFL party.

2021-2022 Committee Assignments
 Labor, Industry, Veterans and Military Affairs Finance and Policy (Chair)
 Agriculture Finance and Policy
 Environment and Natural Resources Finance and Policy
 Ways and Means
2019-2020 Committee Assignments
 Veterans and Military Affairs Finance & Policy Division (Chair)
 Agriculture and Food Finance and Policy
 Environment and Natural Resources Finance Division
 Jobs and Economic Development Finance Division
 Labor
 Ways & Means
2017-2018 Committee Assignments
 Agriculture Finance
 Capital Investment
 Environment & Natural Resources Policy and Finance
 Environment & Natural Resources Policy and Finance: Subcommittee on Mining, Forestry & Tourism
2015-2016 Committee Assignments

(Ecklund only served in 2016)

 Agriculture Finance
 Environment & Natural Resources Policy & Finance
 Greater Minnesota Economic & Workforce Development Policy
 Mining & Outdoor Recreation Policy

Electoral History

Personal life
Ecklund and his wife, Joan, have three children—Nick, Jared, and Cory. They reside in International Falls, Minnesota.

References

External links

 Official House of Representatives website

 Minnesota Secretary of State Website

Living people
People from International Falls, Minnesota
Bemidji State University alumni
County commissioners in Minnesota
Democratic Party members of the Minnesota House of Representatives
21st-century American politicians
1958 births
 United States Marines